The Harlequin Puppet Theatre (founded 1958) is a puppet theatre at Rhos-on-Sea, Wales.  Britain's oldest permanent puppet theatre, the Harlequin was built in 1958 by Eric Bramall and is now run by his former puppeteer partner, Chris Somerville.  The small, 100-seat theatre is home to a collection of approximately 1,000 marionettes that feature in puppet shows during Britain's school holiday seasons.

History
Theatre founder Eric Bramall (born in Wallasey, Merseyside, England) began putting on touring puppet shows in 1946, with the help of his mother.  From 1951 to 1956, Bramall performed increasingly elaborate puppet shows each summer in a temporary theatre built onto an existing bandstand in Colwyn Bay, North Wales.  After Colwyn Bay Council said he could no longer use the bandstand, a fellow puppet enthusiast named Millicent Ford who lived on the seafront at Rhos-on-Sea offered him a portion of her land on which to build a permanent puppet theatre. Architects drew up plans based on Eric Bramall's detailed ideas. The Harlequin was built in eleven weeks, using wood, glass, and local stone salvaged from derelict servants' quarters which had occupied the site.  Bramall painted the murals on the auditorium walls in a single week.  The Opening Ceremony was performed by Sir Clayton Russon on 7 July 1958.  The resulting building won a Civic Trust Award for its design.  Its construction marked the first time in British history that a permanent theatre had been specifically designed and built for puppet playing.

Since 1958 Bramall's marionette skills had been regularly featured on a children's television show; he and co-puppeteer Chris Somerville were subsequently given a weekly 15-minute puppet programme on BBC Wales, which continued until 1984. This and other outside work helped enable the Harlequin Puppet Theatre to stay in business, despite declining attendance over the decades.  Eric Bramall died in July 1996.  his theatre continues to operate under Chris Somerville's stewardship.

In an interview for The Telegraph, Somerville commented on the increasingly endangered status of marionette artistry:

References

External links 
 
 Telegraph article published on 6 Aug 2010

Puppet theaters
Theatres in Wales
Rhos-on-Sea
Puppetry in the United Kingdom